Kamel Mahadin (Arabic: كامل محادين; born June 24, 1954) is a Jordanian architect, landscape architect, professor, author, and artist. He was the Chief Commissioner of Aqaba Special Economic Zone Authority (ASEZA) and was a Jordanian  senator at The House of Senate.

Personal life
Kamel Mahadin is the son of Ottallah Mahadin a retired governor and his mother Huryeh Al Usta. In 1982, he married Khalida Maaitah, with whom he has three sons: Tariq, Yazan, Amer and one daughter Tamara. Apart from Arabic, Mahadin is fluent in English.

Educational life
Kamel was born in Karak, Jordan in 1954, finished secondary education at the high school of Mafraq, Jordan and received a scholarship from the United States Agency for International Development to study architecture at the American University of Beirut. After four years, his scholarship was transferred to the United States due to war in Lebanon; received his bachelor's degree in architecture from Kansas State University and master's degree in landscape architecture from Louisiana State University. Doctorates in environmental designs were awarded from Texas A & M University.
Worked as a campus planner for Louisiana State University and later as a visiting lecturer at Texas A&M University. In 1987 returned to Jordan teaching at the Department of Architecture at University of Jordan, where he became chairman of the department from 1991 to 1995. In 1987, then founded M K Associates; Jordan's only specialized landscape design firm.
Over a period of twenty years, he served as a landscape consultant for Amman Greater Municipality, Mutah University, Al-El Beit University and the Ministry of Tourism and served as a landscape consultant to the Royal Court. In January 1997 he became Director General to Petra Regional Council, and in 1999 took the portfolio as the Ministry of Water and Irrigation.
In June 2000, he came back to teaching and practicing landscape design, running M.K. Associates; a landscape design firm. Practiced design in the United States, the Persian Gulf and the Middle East. With a wide range of published articles in his field. Kamel is a registered landscape architect in the US. He is registered at the International Federation of Landscape Architects, the American Society of Landscape Architects (Texas and Louisiana) and Jordan Society of Architects and Engineers.
As of August 2, 2012. Kamel has been appointed as the chief commissioner of Aqaba Special Economic Zone Authority therefore he withdrawn from MK Associates and MEALA as a chairman of the board.

He was chairman of the board – Aqaba Development Corporation (ADC), chairman of the board – Aqaba Container Terminal (ACT), chairman of the board of Aqaba Airports Company (King Hussein International Airport) and board trustee member of the Tafilah University.

In November 2014, a royal decree was issued approving the Cabinet's acceptance of Kamel Mahadin's resignation as of November 8, while another decree was issued appointing him as senator as of November 9.

In October 2017, Kamel was the first Arab to be awarded the ASLA American Society of Landscape Architects Fellowship. Dr. Mahadin, received his nomination, in Service, from the Council of Fellows Executive Committee.

In November 2019, Kamel has been awarded the "Life Time Achievement Award" at the First Landscape Middle East Awards Ceremony at the Ritz Carlton DIFC Hotel in Dubai, United Arab Emirates. The Event was dedicate to the memory of  Dr Musa Nimah (1942-2016). The awards ceremony honored those who through their dedication, creativity and relentless efforts, have left a positive impact on the landscape profession in the region.

Published research, articles
"MK Associates, The landscape Architects" Al Rayeh Al Hashimeyah Magazine, Issue 30, Oct. 2006.
"The Mastermind of Landscape ". I celebrating Jordan, issue 13, August, 2006.
Mahadin, Kamel O., "Urban Greening, a missing notion ". I celebrating Jordan, issue 11, June, 2006.
Mahadin, Kamel O., "Reading Jordan's Landscape: Missing Lessons". Ekistics, 2006.
Mahadin, Kamel O., Abo Ghanimah, Landscape Design: A Tool for Improving the Middle East Built Environment" accepted for publication, Ekistics, 2006.
Abo Ghanimah, Ali, Mahadin, Kamel O., Alshboul, Abdulsalam, March 2006, "Symbolic and Geometrical Transformation of Stalactite Design in Modern Jordanian Architecture", accepted for publication in Disegnare, Rome University, "la Sapienza", Italy.
Mahadin, Kamel O., Abo Ghanimah, Al-Najarr, Al-Ejel, "People's Perception and Behavior Patterns in Amman Publics Parks and Plazas", Alexandria University Journal, Alexandria University Egypt, March, 2005.
Mahadin, Kamel O., "The House, a Place for creativity" Al-Bait Al-Khaliji, vol. 1, issue 2 Jan. 2005.
Mahadin, Kamel O., " Architectural Islands in The Mediterranean, Dimensions, vol. 2, issue 6 Sep. 2005.
Mahadin, Kamel O., "Landscape design with Middle East", Dimensions, vol. 1, issue 1 Jan. 2004.
Mahadin, Kamel O., Abo Ghanimah, Ali. 2004. "Quest for Quality", published in disegnare, Rome University, "la Sapienza", Italy, n. 29/2004.
Mahadin, Kamel O., " Landscape Architecture, A Form of  Architecture and Construction Art, Dimensions , issue 1  Oct. 2003.
Fethi, Ihsan and Mahadin Kamel O., "Villa Architecture in Amman Current Spectrum of Styles, Presented at " Amman: The City and it Society", 1996, University of Jordan.
Kadhim, Mohamad and Mahadin, Kamel O., " The Concept Of An Archaeological Park at the Citadel of Amman " Ekistics, Athens, vol. 60 .No. 368/369, 1994.
Al-Adhami, Monther, and Dr. Mahadin, Kamel O., "Issues Around The Contemporary Arab City". Open House, Vol. 1, Issue 1, 1994.
Mahadin, Kamel O., "Regionalist Architecture in Jordan: A Critical Review". Open House International, Vol. 19, Issue 1, 1994.

References

Jordanian architects
Jordanian landscape architects
Jordanian writers
Jordanian politicians
1954 births
People from Karak Governorate
Kansas State University alumni
Louisiana State University alumni
Texas A&M University alumni
Living people
Academic staff of the University of Jordan
Jordanian contemporary artists